Paracles laboulbeni is a moth of the subfamily Arctiinae described by M. Bar. It is found in Suriname and the Amazon rainforest.

References

Moths described in 1873
Paracles